Rudasht Rural District is a rural district (dehestan) in Jolgeh District, Isfahan County, Isfahan Province, Iran. At the 2006 census, its population was 586, in 153 families.  The rural district has 1 village.

References 

Rural Districts of Isfahan Province
Isfahan County